Joseph Wackerle (15 May 1880, Partenkirchen – 20 March 1959, Partenkirchen) was a German sculptor. His work was also part of the art competitions at the 1928 Summer Olympics and the 1932 Summer Olympics.

Life
Wackerle's grandfather was a wood carver, and his father was a builder. He was educated at the School of Applied Arts and at the Academy of Fine Arts in Munich. At 26, he was appointed artistic director of the Nymphenburg Porcelain Manufactory in Munich.  From 1913 to 1917 he worked as a teacher at the Museum of Decorative Art in Berlin.  He became a lecturer at the Munich Academy, where he taught until 1950.

In 1937, Joseph Goebbels proposed Wackerle, who was the Reich Culture Senator, for the German National Prize for Art and Science. In 1940, on his 60th Birthday, Wackerle received the Goethe Medal for Art and Science after a recommendation from Adolf Hitler. He was highly rated as an artist by the Nazi rulers, and in August 1944 he was named by Adolf Hitler on the list of the most important German sculptors, which freed him from military duty.

After the end of World War II Wackerle continued his artistic career and was still highly regarded in the Munich area. In 1953, he was awarded the Visual Arts Promotion Prize by the city of Munich.

He died in 1959 and is buried in the cemetery of Partenkirchen.

References

Further reading 
 Robert Thoms: Große Deutsche Kunstausstellung München 1937–1944. Verzeichnis der Künstler in zwei Bänden, Band II: Bildhauer. Berlin 2011, .
 Kurt Lothar Tank Deutsche Plastik unserer Zeit, Munich 1942
 Reinhard Müller-Mehlis Die Kunst im Dritten Reich, Munich 1976, 
 Otto Thomae Die Propaganda-Maschinerie. Bildende Kunst und Öffentlichkeitsarbeit im Dritten Reich, Berlin 1978,

External links 
 
 
 Entry for Joseph Wackerle on the Union List of Artist Names

1880 births
1959 deaths
People from Garmisch-Partenkirchen
20th-century German sculptors
20th-century German male artists
German male sculptors
Artists from Bavaria
Olympic competitors in art competitions